Lahcen Ouadani (born 14 July 1959) is a Moroccan football defender who played for Morocco in the 1986 FIFA World Cup. He also played for FAR Rabat.

References

External links

1959 births
Moroccan footballers
Morocco international footballers
Association football defenders
AS FAR (football) players
Botola players
Olympic footballers of Morocco
Footballers at the 1984 Summer Olympics
1986 FIFA World Cup players
1986 African Cup of Nations players
1988 African Cup of Nations players
Competitors at the 1983 Mediterranean Games
Mediterranean Games gold medalists for Morocco
Mediterranean Games medalists in football
Living people